Athletes from East Germany (German Democratic Republic; GDR) and West Germany (Federal Republic of Germany; FRG) competed together as the United Team of Germany at the 1960 Summer Olympics in Rome, Italy. 293 competitors, 238 men and 55 women, took part in 148 events in 17 sports.

Medalists
Nationality in brackets.

Gold
 Armin Hary — Athletics, Men's 100 metres
 Bernd Cullmann, Armin Hary, Walter Mahlendorf, Martin Lauer (all from ) — Athletics, Men's 4 × 100 m Relay
 Dieter Krause, Günter Perleberg, Paul Lange, Friedhelm Wentzke — Canoeing, Men's K1 4 × 500 m
 Ingrid Krämer — Diving, Women's 3m Springboard
 Ingrid Krämer — Diving, Women's 10m Platform
 Hans Günter Winkler, Fritz Thiedemann, Alwin Schockemöhle (all from ) — Equestrian, Jumping Team
 Heidi Schmid — Fencing, Women's Foil
 Bernhard Knubel, Heinz Renneberg, Klaus Zerta (all from ) — Rowing, Men's Coxed Pairs
 Gerd Cintl, Horst Effertz, Klaus Riekemann, Jürgen Litz, Michael Obst (all from ) — Rowing, Men's Coxed Fours
 Manfred Rulffs, Walter Schröder, Frank Schepke, Kraft Schepke, Karl-Heinrich von Groddeck, Karl-Heinz Hopp, Klaus Bittner, Hans Lenk, Willi Padge (all from ) — Rowing, Men's Eight
 Peter Kohnke — Shooting, Men's 50m Rifle Prone
 Wilfried Dietrich — Wrestling, Men's Freestyle Heavyweight

Silver
 Carl Kaufmann — Athletics, Men's 400 metres
 Hans Grodotzki — Athletics, Men's 5.000 metres
 Hans Grodotzki — Athletics, Men's 10.000 metres
 Manfred Kinder, Joachim Reske, Johannes Kaiser, Carl Kaufmann (all from ) — Athletics, Men's 4 × 400 m Relay
 Jutta Heine — Athletics, Women's 200 metres
 Martha Langbein, Anni Biechl, Brunhilde Hendrix, Jutta Heine (all from ) — Athletics, Women's 4 × 100 m Relay
 Walter Krüger — Athletics, Men's Javelin Throw
 Johanna Lüttge — Athletics, Women's Shot Put
 Therese Zenz — Canoeing, Women's K1 500m Kayak Singles
 Therese Zenz, Ingrid Hartmann (both from ) — Canoeing, Women's K2 500m Kayak Pairs
 Gustav-Adolf Schur, Egon Adler, Erich Hagen, Günter Lörke (all from ) — Cycling, Men's Team Time Trial
 Siegried Köhler, Bernd Barleben, Peter Gröning, Manfred Klieme (all from ) — Cycling, Men's Team Pursuit
 Jürgen Simon, Lothar Stäber (both from ) — Cycling, Men's Tandem
 Dieter Gieseler — Cycling, Men's 1.000m Time Trial
 Achim Hill — Rowing, Men's Single Sculls
 Wiltrud Urselmann — Swimming, Women's 200m Breaststroke
 Lothar Metz — Wrestling, Men's Greco-Roman Middleweight
 Günther Maritschnigg — Wrestling, Men's Greco-Roman Welterweight
 Wilfried Dietrich — Wrestling, Men's Greco-Roman Heavyweight

Bronze
 Ursula Donath — Athletics, Women's 800 metres
 Gisela Birkemeyer — Athletics, Women's 80m Hurdles
 Hildrun Claus — Athletics, Women's Long Jump
 Günter Siegmund — Boxing, Men's Heavyweight
 Josef Neckermann — Equestrian, Dressage Individual
 Jürgen Theuerkauff, Tim Gerresheim, Eberhard Mehl, Jürgen Brecht (all from ) — Fencing, Men's Team Foil
 Rolf Mulka, Ingo von Bredow (both from ) — Sailing, Flying Dutchman
 Klaus Zähringer — Shooting, Men's 50m Rifle Three Positions
 Barbara Göbel — Swimming, Women's 200m Breaststroke
 Christel Steffin, Heidi Pechstein, Gisela Weiß, Ursel Brunner — Swimming, Women's 4 × 100 m Freestyle Relay
 Ingrid Schmidt, Ursula Küper, Bärbel Fuhrmann, Ursel Brunner — Swimming, Women's 4 × 100 m Medley Relay

Athletics

Boxing

Canoeing

Cycling

14 male cyclists represented Germany in 1960.

Individual road race
 Egon Adler
 Erich Hagen
 Bernhard Eckstein
 Gustav-Adolf Schur

Team time trial
 Gustav-Adolf Schur
 Egon Adler
 Erich Hagen
 Günter Lörke

Sprint
 August Rieke
 Günter Kaslowski

1000m time trial
 Dieter Gieseler

Tandem
 Jürgen Simon
 Lothar Stäber

Team pursuit
 Siegfried Köhler
 Peter Gröning
 Manfred Klieme
 Bernd Barleben

Diving

Equestrian

Fencing

19 fencers, 13 men and 6 women, represented Germany in 1960.

Men's foil
 Eberhard Mehl
 Tim Gerresheim
 Jürgen Brecht

Men's team foil
 Jürgen Brecht, Tim Gerresheim, Eberhard Mehl, Jürgen Theuerkauff

Men's épée
 Paul Gnaier
 Georg Neuber
 Dieter Fänger

Men's team épée
 Paul Gnaier, Fritz Zimmermann, Dieter Fänger, Georg Neuber, Helmut Anschütz, Walter Köstner

Men's sabre
 Jürgen Theuerkauff
 Walter Köstner
 Wilfried Wöhler

Men's team sabre
 Dieter Löhr, Jürgen Theuerkauff, Wilfried Wöhler, Peter von Krockow, Walter Köstner

Women's foil
 Heidi Schmid
 Helga Mees
 Rosemarie Weiß-Scherberger

Women's team foil
 Heidi Schmid, Helga Mees, Helga Stroh, Helmi Höhle, Gudrun Theuerkauff, Rosemarie Weiß-Scherberger

Field hockey

Fourteen male field hockey players competed in 1960, when the German team finished in 7th place.

 Carsten Keller
 Christian Büchting
 Dieter Krause
 Eberhard Ferstl
 Günther Ullerich
 Helmut Nonn
 Herbert Winters
 Hugo Budinger
 Klaus Greinert
 Klaus Woeller
 Norbert Schuler
 Werner Delmes
 Willi Brendel
 Wolfgang End

Gymnastics

Modern pentathlon

Three male pentathletes represented Germany in 1960.

Individual
 Wolfgang Gödicke
 Dieter Krickow
 Ralf Berckhan

Team
 Wolfgang Gödicke
 Dieter Krickow
 Ralf Berckhan

Rowing

The United Team of Germany had 26 male rowers participate in all seven rowing events in 1960.

 Men's single sculls – 2nd place ( silver medal)
 Achim Hill

 Men's double sculls
 Heinz Becher
 Günter Schroers

 Men's coxless pair – 4th place
 Jochen Neuling
 Heinz Weigel

 Men's coxed pair – 1st place ( gold medal)
 Bernhard Knubel
 Heinz Renneberg
 Klaus Zerta

 Men's coxless four
 Victor Hendrix
 Manfred Kluth
 Georg Niermann
 Albrecht Wehselau

 Men's coxed four – 1st place ( gold medal)
 Gerd Cintl
 Horst Effertz
 Klaus Riekemann
 Jürgen Litz
 Michael Obst

 Men's eight – 1st place ( gold medal)
 Manfred Rulffs
 Walter Schröder
 Frank Schepke
 Kraft Schepke
 Karl-Heinrich von Groddeck
 Karl-Heinz Hopp
 Klaus Bittner
 Hans Lenk
 Willi Padge

Sailing

Shooting

Ten shooters represented Germany in 1960. Peter Kohnke won gold in the 50 m rifle, prone and Klaus Zähringer won bronze in the 50 m rifle, three positions.

25 m pistol
 Heinz Franke
 Heinrich Gollwitzer

50 m pistol
 Horst Kadner
 Wolfgang Losack

300 m rifle, three positions
 Hans-Joachim Mars

50 m rifle, three positions
 Klaus Zähringer
 Bernd Klingner

50 m rifle, prone
 Peter Kohnke
 Bernd Klingner

Trap
 Gerhard Aßmus
 Heinz Kramer

Swimming

Water polo

Weightlifting

Wrestling

References

External links
 Official Olympic Reports
 International Olympic Committee results database

Nations at the 1960 Summer Olympics
1960
Summer Olympics